Pandharmati is a village in Harda District, madhya Pradesh, India. Its largest neighbour is indore, 189 km away from the village. Closer destinations include Timarni, Nemawar, Bori Wildlife Sanctuary, Khirkiya, and Kesla. The nearest railway station is in timarni. The Narmada River is about 50 km away.

The Gond and Korku tribes of people live in the southern hill region of Pandharmati, which was historically under Makdai rule, led by the king of the Gonds. Jhadbida, the closest village to Pandharmati, has its own panchayat. Pandharmati is known for its lush green lands.

Culture
The people of Pandharmati are best known for adopting new trends and lifestyles. Women wear saris with kardhani. Pandharmati has its own dance styles, cuisine, and music.

Statistical data
According to the 2001 census, there were approximately 127 households with a total population of 669. Of this population, 125 were under the age of 6. The male population was 358 and the female population was 311. The number of literate individuals was 295 (180 men and 115 women).

External links
 Official website of Harda District
 Social and Developmental Canvas of the village

Villages in Harda district